Ramzy Ezzeldin Ramzy (born February 4, 1954) is a retired Egyptian diplomat and former Senior United Nations official .

Biography

Ambassador Ramzy Ezzeldin Ramzy’s diplomatic career spans over 43 years in which he served in the United Nations, the League of Arab States and the Egyptian diplomatic service. His main areas of expertise lie in conflict resolution, mediation, international security, disarmament and non-proliferation. His latest assignment was as United Nations Assistant Secretary-General and Deputy Special Envoy for Syria from September 2014 to March 2019. 

Prior to this, Ambassador Ramzy served in the Egyptian Ministry of Foreign Affairs for 38 years which culminated in the position of Senior Under-Secretary in 2012 . He also served as Assistant Minister for International Economic Affairs ( 2007-2008); Deputy Assistant Minister for Disarmament and International Security ( 2000- 2003); and Director for United Nations Affairs ( 1990-1993 ).  

Ambassador Ramzy served as ambassador to Germany ( 2008-2012), Austria ( 2003-2007)and Brazil ( 1997-2000) and as non-resident ambassador to Slovakia ( 2003- 2007), Guyana (1997-2000) and Suriname ( 1998-2000). He was the Egyptian Permanent Representative to UN and other international organizations in Vienna where he also served as Governor of the International Atomic Energy Agency (IAEA) Board (2003-2007). He was also Deputy Chief of Mission at the Egyptian embassy in Washington D.C. ( 1993-1997), Political Counselor in Moscow ( 1986-1990) and Second Secretary at the Permanent Mission to the UN in New York( 1978- 1982). He was also served as a political affairs officer at the Department of Disarmament Affairs at the United Nations in New York ( 1982- 1983 ). 

Ambassador Ramzy also served as the Head of the  League of Arab States Permanent Mission to the UN and other international organizations in Vienna ( 2013-2014). 

He served as head or member of Egyptian delegations in numerous international conferences and meetings such as the General Conferences of IAEA, UNIDO, CTBTO, UNCTAD and the OSCE, as well as the UN General Assembly, Summits and Ministerial Meetings of the Arab League, the African Union (AU), the Islamic Conference (OIC) and OPEC.

Ambassador Ramzy served on the Board of the School of Economics and Political Science of Cairo University ( 2007- 2008 ). He has contributed op-ed articles to the leading Arabic language newspaper AlSharq Al Awsat, leading Egyptian newspapers (Al-Masry Al-Youm and Al-Shorouk), Al Ahram Weekly as well as the Financial Times. His articles have also been published by the Cairo Review of Global Affairs and the Valdai Discussion Club. He was speaker at various international fora and events  , amongst which are the Manama Dialogues, Sir Bani Yas, Munich Security Conference Strategy Forum, The Valdai Discussion Club, Middle East Institute,the Tahrir Dialogues and the Beirut Institute Summit. 

Ambassador Ramzy graduated from Victoria College in Cairo and holds a B.A. in Economics from the American University in Cairo and a M.Sc. in International Economics from Surrey University in the U.K.

References

1954 births
Living people
The American University in Cairo alumni
Alumni of the University of Surrey
20th-century Egyptian diplomats
21st-century Egyptian diplomats
Ambassadors of Egypt to Germany
Ambassadors of Egypt to Austria
Ambassadors of Egypt to Slovakia
Ambassadors of Egypt to Brazil
Ambassadors of Egypt to Guyana
Ambassadors of Egypt to Suriname
Permanent Representatives of Egypt to the United Nations